The Basin Complex Fire was a massive wildfire near Big Sur that ignited on June 21, 2008 and was the result of a lightning strike. State and federal officials spent more than $120 million to fight the fire, making it the most expensive fire in California history up to that point and the second most expensive in U.S. history, exceeded only by the Biscuit Fire in 2002. Eventually, the Thomas Fire surpassed the Basin Complex Fire in firefighting costs as well.

The fire
The wildfire forced the evacuation of Big Sur prior to the July 4 holiday weekend. Camp Pico Blanco was forced to evacuate the camp and diverted its Scouts to Boulder Creek Scout Reservation in Santa Cruz. The camp lost only one building, an outlying ranger's cabin. Big Sur residents were permitted to return on July 9.

, the fire is the 20th largest wildfire in California, since accurate records began in 1932.

References

2008 California wildfires
Wildfires in Monterey County, California
Santa Lucia Range
Monterey Ranger District, Los Padres National Forest
June 2008 events in the United States
July 2008 events in the United States